Javorek is a surname. Notable people with the surname include:

Istvan Javorek (born 1943), American sports conditioning coach
Justín Javorek (1936–2021), Slovak footballer and manager
Petr Javorek (born 1986), Czech footballer